Dixie High School may refer to various schools in the USA:
Dixie High School (Ohio) — New Lebanon, Ohio
Dixie High School (South Carolina) — Due West, South Carolina
Dixie High School (Utah) — St. George, Utah
Dixie High School (Washington) — Dixie, Washington

There is also a Dixie Heights High School in Edgewood, Kentucky (postal address Fort Mitchell).